First Congregational Church (also known as Brethren Church or Old Congregational Church) is a church at 502 South National Avenue in Fort Scott, Kansas. The Gothic Revival church was built in 1872-73 and added to the National Register of Historic Places in 2005.

It was built in brick to replace the original First Congregational Church which was made of wood and which burned in 1872.  The church "is an excellent example of the English Gothic style of architecture, with its pointed arch (lancet) windows, vaulted ceiling, steeply pitched roof and tall steeple."

References

Churches on the National Register of Historic Places in Kansas
Gothic Revival church buildings in Kansas
Churches completed in 1873
Buildings and structures in Bourbon County, Kansas
National Register of Historic Places in Bourbon County, Kansas